The Firestone Tyre Factory on the Great West Road in Brentford in the London Borough of Hounslow was an example of Art Deco architecture. It was designed by Wallis, Gilbert and Partners for the Firestone Tire and Rubber Company. Built on a 26-acre site, it opened in October 1928 and was the second factory to open on the Great West Road, following Hudson-Essex Motors of Great Britain Limited which opened in 1927.

Demolition and controversy
The company announced in November 1979 that it would close the factory.

After its purchase by Trafalgar House, the building was demolished during the August 1980 bank holiday weekend, reportedly in anticipation of its becoming listed. The Twentieth Century Society call the structure their "first serious case" and say that its destruction "focused public attention on the necessity for greater protection for 20th century buildings and led directly to the listing of 150 examples of inter-war architecture (including Battersea Power Station) by the government".
The gates, piers and railings fencing the site received a Grade II listing in 2001.

See also
India Tyre Factory
Fort Dunlop
Michelin House
Hoover Building

References

External links

  Globalnet.co.uk: Firestone Factory
  Britainfromabove.org: Firestone tyre factory
  Brentford and Chiswicklhs.org: Firestone Factory
  Disused-stations.org:  Brentford

Manufacturing plants in England
Brentford, London
Bridgestone
Demolished buildings and structures in London
Demolished manufacturing buildings and structures
History of the London Borough of Hounslow
History of Middlesex
Buildings and structures completed in 1928
Buildings and structures demolished in 1980
1928 establishments in England
1980 disestablishments in England
Grade II listed buildings in the London Borough of Hounslow
Grade II listed industrial buildings
Art Deco architecture in London